Felicity Campbell may refer to:
 Felicity Campbell (speed skater)
 Felicity Campbell (artist)